Nicholas Egan (17 July 1903 – 5 December 1971) was an Irish Fianna Fáil politician. He contested the  Laois–Offaly constituency at the 1951 general election but was not elected. 

He was elected to Dáil Éireann as a Fianna Fáil Teachta Dála (TD) at the subsequent 1954 general election and held his seat until retiring at the 1969 general election.

References

1903 births
1971 deaths
Fianna Fáil TDs
Members of the 15th Dáil
Members of the 16th Dáil
Members of the 17th Dáil
Members of the 18th Dáil